Ann Walsh is a visual artist, primarily working with paint, Plexiglas and vinyl. Her work has been displayed in The Everson Museum of Art, the Portland Museum of Art, the Saint-Gaudens National Historic Site and the Lori Bookstein Gallery, among others.

Walsh was born in Minneapolis, Minnesota, but received her bachelor of arts, then a masters of fine arts at Syracuse University in 1979. She later relocated to New York City, where she currently resides. She is married to fellow artist James Walsh.

Her artistic style has been compared to the color fields of Kenneth Noland and to sculptor Anne Truitt. She is a painter that usually works in three dimensions. Her work is described as "process-based", "formalist", "minimal or hard-edge" abstraction. Walsh's use of color, described as warm and nuanced, have been likened to Noland and Helen Frankenthaler. Her relationships with art critic Clement Greenberg, artists Jules Olitski, Anthony Caro and Noland, among others, have influenced her development.

Selected shows
 Sideshow, Williamsburg, Brooklyn, 2014-2003 
 Saint-Gaudens National Historic Site, (with James Walsh), 2012 
 Summer Edition, Lori Bookstein Fine Art, 2012 
 Color and Edge, Sideshow, Williamsburg, Brooklyn 2012
 Lori Bookstein Fine Art, Color as Structure, 2007
 University of Massachusetts, Amherst, MA, 2005
 Alexander Brest Museum and Gallery, Jacksonville University, Jacksonville, Florida, (2 person show), 2002 
 Clement Greenberg: A Critic's Collection, Portland Museum of Art, Portland, Oregon (toured Tulsa, Oklahoma, Dayton, Ohio, Syracuse, New York, Columbia, South Carolina, Naples, Florida, Palm Springs, California), 2001 
 Greenberg Wilson Gallery, NYC, 1991, 1990, 1989
 C. Grimaldis Gallery, Baltimore 1987
 The Everson Museum of Art, Syracuse, NY 1981

References

External links
 Ann Walsh’s website

American contemporary painters
Modern artists
20th-century American artists
American abstract artists
Minimalist artists
Artists from New York City
Painters from Minnesota
American women painters
20th-century American women artists
Year of birth missing (living people)
Living people
Syracuse University alumni
Artists from Minneapolis
21st-century American women artists